Nebria cordicollis tenuissima is a subspecies of ground beetle in the Nebriinae subfamily that is endemic to Switzerland.

References

cordicollis tenuissima
Beetles described in 1925
Beetles of Europe
Endemic fauna of Switzerland